Florian Meyer (born 14 July 1987) is a German professional footballer who plays as a midfielder for Regionalliga Nord club SC Weiche Flensburg 08.

References

Living people
1987 births
People from Preetz
Footballers from Schleswig-Holstein
German footballers
Association football midfielders
Holstein Kiel players
Holstein Kiel II players
SC Weiche Flensburg 08 players
3. Liga players
Regionalliga players